The 1965 Italian Grand Prix (formally the XXXVI Gran Premio d'Italia) was a Formula One motor race held at Monza on 12 September 1965. It was race 8 of 10 in both the 1965 World Championship of Drivers and the 1965 International Cup for Formula One Manufacturers. The race was won by Jackie Stewart who took his first Grand Prix victory, whilst driving for the BRM team. His teammate - Graham Hill - finished second after a closely contested race between both the pair and pole-sitter and Jim Clark, who driving for the Lotus-Climax team, had secured the 1965 Drivers' Championship at the previous race. His fuel-pump failure with a handful of laps to go, and also the preceding retirement of Ferrari driver John Surtees, ensured that Dan Gurney of the Brabham-Climax team picked up the final position on the podium.

Race report
Jim Clark duelled for the lead through the first two-thirds of the race with Graham Hill, Jackie Stewart and John Surtees (who dropped out with clutch problems), until lap 64 when his fuel pump failed. Stewart took up the lead and it was expected that he would move over to give his team leader the victory. The enthusiastic crowd were waiting for the BRM cars to come over the line in formation. However, on the approach to the Parabolica on the last time, Hill moved over too far and bounced across the grass, struggling to maintain grip on the mud and gravel. Stewart therefore claimed his first win in a BRM 1–2 from Hill. Dan Gurney took the final podium place and Lorenzo Bandini, Bruce McLaren and Richard Attwood completed the placings. The race featured 42 lead changes between four drivers (all British), the most ever in a Formula One motor race.

Classification

Qualifying

Race

Championship standings after the race

Drivers' Championship standings

Constructors' Championship standings

 Notes: Only the top five positions are included for both sets of standings. Only best 6 results counted toward the championship. Numbers without parentheses are championship points, numbers in parentheses are total points scored.

References

Italian Grand Prix
Italian Grand Prix
Grand Prix